The 1995 Alabama A&M Bulldogs football team represented Alabama Agricultural and Mechanical University as a member of the Southern Intercollegiate Athletic Conference (SIAC) during the 1995 NCAA Division II football season. Led by first-year head coach Kenneth Pettiford, the Bulldogs compiled an overall record of 6–5 with a mark of 5–3 in conference play, tying for second place in the SIAC.

Schedule

References

Alabama AandM
Alabama A&M Bulldogs football seasons
Alabama AandM Bulldogs football